Director of Education may refer to:

 Director of Education (Hong Kong)
 Director of Education (Ontario)

See also
Director-General of Education, a title of agency heads in the Ministry of Education (Singapore)